The streak-capped antwren (Terenura maculata) is a species of bird in the family Thamnophilidae.

It is found in the southern Atlantic Forest. Its natural habitats are subtropical or tropical moist lowland forest and subtropical or tropical moist montane forest.

References

streak-capped antwren
Birds of the Atlantic Forest
streak-capped antwren
Taxonomy articles created by Polbot